Selb-Plößberg station is a railway station in the municipality of Selb, located in the Wunsiedel district in Bavaria, Germany.

References

Railway stations in Bavaria
Buildings and structures in Wunsiedel (district)